The 1988 Dutch TT was the eighth round of the 1988 Grand Prix motorcycle racing season. It took place on the weekend of 23–25 June 1988 at the TT Circuit Assen located in Assen, Netherlands.

500 cc race report

Christian Sarron on pole, but dropped to the back after a terrible start. Through the first turn it was Eddie Lawson, Pierfrancesco Chili, Ron Haslam, Didier De Radiguès, Wayne Gardner, et al.

Haslam ran wide and rode off into the grass.

Through the chicane at the end of the first lap, it was Lawson, De Radiguès, Chili, Gardner, Kevin Magee, Rob McElnea, Randy Mamola, Patrick Igoa, Sarron and Wayne Rainey.

There was a small gap from Lawson to De Radiguès to Gardner.

Gardner caught De Radiguès and started to bridge up to Lawson.

De Radiguès slid out but remounted. Sarron and Magee fought for 3rd.

Approaching back markers, Gardner passed Lawson.

500 cc classification

References

Dutch TT
Dutch
Tourist Trophy